General Field may refer to:

Burton M. Field (fl. 1970s–2010s), U.S. Air Force lieutenant general
Charles W. Field (1828–1892), Confederate States Army major general
Chris Field (general) (fl. 1980s–2020s), Australian Army major general

See also
Lewis J. Fields (1909–1988), U.S. Marine Corps lieutenant general
Attorney General Field (disambiguation)